Georg Witkowski (11 September 1863, Berlin – 11 September 1939, Amsterdam) was a German literary historian.

Literary works 
  Die Handlung des zweiten Teils von Goethes Faust - Akademische Antrittsvorlesung, 1898, Dr. Seele & Co., Leipzig
 Goethe, 1899
 Das deutsche Drama des 19. Jahrhunderts, 1903
 Goethes Faust, 1906
 Die Entwicklung der deutschen Literatur seit 1830, 1911

See also
Witkowski

References

1863 births
1939 deaths
19th-century German historians
20th-century German historians
German expatriates in the Netherlands
Writers from Berlin
19th-century German male writers
German male non-fiction writers